Prairie Lea High School or Prairie Lea School is a public high school located in Prairie Lea, Texas (USA) and classified as a 1A school by the UIL. It is part of the Prairie Lea Independent School District located in west central Caldwell County. In 2015, the school was rated "Met Standard" by the Texas Education Agency.

Athletics
The Prairie Lea Indians compete in the following sports 

Basketball
Cross Country
6-Man Football
Golf
Tennis
Track and Field
Volleyball

Notable Game
In 1938, University Interscholastic League Director, Rodney Kidd, asked coaches at Prairie Lea High School and Martindale High School located just south of Austin to study the rules for six man football.  They later played an exhibition game for UIL officials, who must have been impressed, as they officially sanctioned six-man play for the fall of 1938.  Both schools competed in six-man that first fall and tied for the district 3 title with Dripping Springs.  In that first year, only 55 schools participated in six-man football.  A year later, the number grew to 112 schools.  At one time as many as 160 teams across Texas have participated.

Prairie Lea would discontinue its football program in the late 1950s, but would resume play in the fall of 2001.

State Titles
Boys Basketball 
1944(B), 1945(B)
One Act Play 
1975(1A)
2020 UIL Ready Writing State Championship Caleb Densman

See also

List of high schools in Texas
List of Six-man football stadiums in Texas

References

External links
Prairie Lea ISD

Schools in Caldwell County, Texas
Public high schools in Texas
Public middle schools in Texas
Public elementary schools in Texas